Pocahontas is a historic former community in Baker County, Oregon, United States. It lies northwest of Baker City along Pocahontas Road near the Elkhorn Mountains.

The town was named after Pocahontas, a famous Native American woman. According to Oregon Geographic Names, which cites Thirty-One Years in Baker County, an unknown number of people laid out a town called Pine City in the 1860s near the base of the mountains. Pine City, probably founded in 1862, was along Pine Creek and was meant to serve as a place of accommodation for miners and others traveling through the region. Meanwhile, John McClain, a rancher who lived nearby, established Pocahontas and persuaded the people of Pine City to move there.

Pocahontas, also meant as a traveler's resting stop, soon had a hotel, blacksmith shop, and express office. It set up a post office on August 4, 1863, with Thomas McMurran as postmaster. The year of the post-office closing is in doubt, either 1864 or 1872.

References

External links
Photo of Pocahontas school site – Baker County Oregon History and Genealogy

Former populated places in Baker County, Oregon
Former populated places in Oregon